Palmodes is a genus of thread-waisted wasps in the family Sphecidae. There are more than 20 described species in Palmodes.

Species
These 21 species belong to the genus Palmodes:

 Palmodes californicus R. Bohart & Menke, 1961
 Palmodes carbo Bohart & Menke, 1963
 Palmodes dimidiatus (De Geer, 1773)
 Palmodes garamantis (Roth, 1959)
 Palmodes hesperus Bohart & Menke, 1961
 Palmodes insularis Bohart & Menke, 1961
 Palmodes laeviventris (Cresson, 1865)
 Palmodes lissus Bohart & Menke, 1961
 Palmodes melanarius (Mocsáry, 1883)
 Palmodes minor (F. Morawitz, 1890)
 Palmodes occitanicus (Lepeletier de Saint Fargeau & Serville, 1828)
 Palmodes orientalis (Mocsáry, 1883)
 Palmodes pacificus Bohart & Menke, 1961
 Palmodes palmetorum (Roth, 1963)
 Palmodes parvulus (Roth in de Beaumont, 1967)
 Palmodes praestans (Kohl, 1890)
 Palmodes pusillus (Gussakovskij, 1930)
 Palmodes rufiventris
 Palmodes sagax (Kohl, 1890)
 Palmodes strigulosus (A. Costa, 1861)
 Palmodes stygicus Bohart & Menke, 1961

References

Sphecidae
Articles created by Qbugbot